Misia Greatest Hits is Misia's first compilation album and last release with Arista Japan, released on March 3, 2002. It sold 587,210 copies in its first week and peaked at #1 for two consecutive weeks. Misia Greatest Hits was the highest selling compilation album of 2002. It is the 30th best selling compilation album and 90th best selling album overall of all time in Japan. The album includes an enhanced music video for the unreleased track, Amai Koibito, featuring Melonpan.

Track listing

Charts

Oricon Sales Chart

Physical Sales Charts

References

External links
Sony Music Online Japan : MISIA

2002 greatest hits albums
Misia compilation albums